Pool-in-Wharfedale railway station was a railway station serving the village of Pool-in-Wharfedale in West Yorkshire, England. It was opened by the North Eastern Railway (NER) as part of a branch line constructed to link the line between Leeds and Harrogate with a new joint line, the Otley and Ilkley Joint Railway that the NER was building in conjunction with the Midland Railway. The station operated for 100 years, being opened in 1865 and closing as part of the Beeching cuts in March 1965. The station's name appeared as Pool in earlier Bradshaws, but changed to Pool-in-Wharfedale by the October 1931 issue. 

The defunct railway was lifted in 1966 and the station building was demolished in 1974; a housing development now occupies the site.

The trackbed between Burley in Wharfedale, Otley and Pool is to become a cycleway, footpath and equestrian route known as the Wharfedale Greenway, with possible extensions onward to Ilkley alongside the extant railway. Planning permission for the first phase of the greenway was granted in July 2020.

References

External links
 Pool-in-Wharfedale station on navigable 1947 O. S. map
 Pool-in-Wharfedale Railway Line and Station

Disused railway stations in Leeds
Beeching closures in England
Former North Eastern Railway (UK) stations
Railway stations in Great Britain opened in 1865
Railway stations in Great Britain closed in 1965
1865 establishments in England
1965 disestablishments in England